Celebrity Letters and Numbers is an Australian comedy panel game show on SBS which premiered on 2 October 2021. It is a revived version of the game show Letters and Numbers, which aired on SBS from 2010 to 2012, with an altered format with celebrity contestants competing rather than members of the public. Co-hosts David Astle and Lily Serna returned from the original series, while comedian, journalist and actor Michael Hing replaced presenter Richard Morecroft as host.

Two series of twelve episodes were commissioned in July 2021 with celebrity guests including Hamish Blake, Susie Youssef, Merrick Watts and Matt Okine, and the third season will air from 17 September 2022. The show is similar to the British comedy panel show 8 Out of 10 Cats Does Countdown, which also features celebrity comedians and airs on SBS in Australia.

Gameplay

Unlike the original version of Letters and Numbers, each episode features three contestants competing individually and the winning contestant does not return for the next episode. Additionally, instead of winning a Macquarie Dictionary, the guest with the most points wins a single volume from the 1980s Oceaniapaedia encyclopedia, allegedly donated by the Hing family. Another addition is the inclusion of a Dictionary Corner guest, as in the British show Countdown, who sits beside Astle. The mix of letters and numbers rounds, the final nine-letter conundrum and the eight-letter word mixes preceding the commercial break are retained from the original series.

Episodes

Season 1 (2021)
Note: Winners are listed in bold

Season 2 (Early 2022)
Note: Winners are listed in bold

Season 3 (Late 2022)
Note: Winners are listed in bold

See also
8 Out of 10 Cats Does Countdown
Letters and Numbers
Countdown

References

External links
SBS On Demand: Celebrity Letters and Numbers

Special Broadcasting Service original programming
2021 Australian television series debuts
2020s Australian comedy television series
2020s Australian game shows
English-language television shows
Television series by ITV Studios
Australian television series based on non-Australian television series